Tetiana Petrova (born 5 June 1993) is a Ukrainian freestyle skier, specializing in  moguls. She competed for Ukraine at the 2018 Winter Olympics in the women's moguls event.

Career
Petrova began competing in February 2014 winning national championships in Slovenia. Next year she debuted at World Championships in Kreischberg, Austria, where she was 33rd in moguls and 31st in dual moguls. Later she took a pause and returned at 2017 Winter Universiade in Almaty, Kazakhstan, where she finished 5th in both moguls and dual moguls. At 2017 World Championships in Spain's Sierra Nevada she was 29th in moguls and 27th in dual moguls. On December 9, 2017, she debuted at FIS Freestyle Skiing World Cup in Finnish Ruka where she finished 41st. As of February 2018, her best World Cup finish is 40th.

Career results

Winter Olympics

World Championships

References

External links
 FIS profile

1993 births
Living people
Ukrainian female freestyle skiers
Freestyle skiers at the 2018 Winter Olympics
Olympic freestyle skiers of Ukraine